A cryogenic rocket engine is a rocket engine that uses a cryogenic fuel and oxidizer; that is, both its fuel and oxidizer are gases which have been liquefied and are stored at very low temperatures. These highly efficient engines were first flown on the US Atlas-Centaur and were one of the main factors of NASA's success in reaching the Moon by the Saturn V rocket.

Rocket engines burning cryogenic propellants remain in use today on high performance upper stages and boosters. Upper stages are numerous. Boosters include ESA's Ariane 5, JAXA's H-II, and the United States Delta IV and Space Launch System. The United States, Russia, Japan, India, France and China are the only countries that have operational cryogenic rocket engines.

History

Cryogenic propellants

Rocket engines need high mass flow rates of both oxidizer and fuel to generate useful thrust. Oxygen, the simplest and most common oxidizer, is in the gas phase at standard temperature and pressure, as is hydrogen, the simplest fuel. While it is possible to store propellants as pressurized gases, this would require large, heavy tanks that would make achieving orbital spaceflight difficult if not impossible. On the other hand, if the propellants are cooled sufficiently, they exist in the liquid phase at higher density and lower pressure, simplifying tankage. These cryogenic temperatures vary depending on the propellant, with liquid oxygen existing below  and liquid hydrogen below . Since one or more of the propellants is in the liquid phase, all cryogenic rocket engines are by definition liquid-propellant rocket engines.

Various cryogenic fuel-oxidizer combinations have been tried, but the combination of liquid hydrogen (LH2) fuel and the liquid oxygen (LOX) oxidizer is one of the most widely used.

Components and combustion cycles
The major components of a cryogenic rocket engine are the combustion chamber, pyrotechnic initiator, fuel injector, fuel and oxidizer turbopumps, cryo valves, regulators, the fuel tanks, and rocket engine nozzle. In terms of feeding propellants to the combustion chamber, cryogenic rocket engines are almost exclusively pump-fed. Pump-fed engines work in a gas-generator cycle, a staged-combustion cycle, or an expander cycle. Gas-generator engines tend to be used on booster engines due to their lower efficiency, staged-combustion engines can fill both roles at the cost of greater complexity, and expander engines are exclusively used on upper stages due to their low thrust.

LOX+LH2 rocket engines by country
Currently, six countries have successfully developed and deployed cryogenic rocket engines:

Comparison of first stage cryogenic rocket engines

Comparison of upper stage cryogenic rocket engines

References

External links
 USA's Cryogenic Rocket engine RL10B-2
Russian Cryogenic Rocket Engines

Rocket propulsion
Rocket engines
Rocket
 
Hydrogen technologies